Nová Vieska is a village and municipality in the Nové Zámky District in the Nitra Region of south-west Slovakia.

History
In historical records the village was first mentioned in 1295.

Geography
The municipality lies at an altitude of 135 metres and covers an area of 17.481 km2.

Population
On 31 December 2011, it had a population of 736 people.

Facilities
The village has a small public library and a football pitch.

References

External links
https://web.archive.org/web/20070513023228/http://www.statistics.sk/mosmis/eng/run.html 
Nová Vieska – Nové Zámky Okolie

Villages and municipalities in Nové Zámky District